The R1000 was a workstation released in 1985 by Rational Software for the design, documentation, implementation, and maintenance of large software systems written using the Ada programming language. The R1000 featured an extensive tool set, including:

 an Ada-83-compatible program design language
 an integrated development environment that doubled as an operating system shell
 automatic generation of design documentation
 source-language debugging
 interactive design-rule checking and semantic analysis
 incremental compilation 
 configuration management and version control.

Optimizing code generators and cross-debuggers provided support for several popular application architectures.

As a successor to the R1000, Rational produced a new IDE called Rational Apex.  Rational Apex took many of the features that the R1000 introduced and extended (ported) them onto commonly available workstations from Sun Microsystems and IBM.

Several R1000 units exist in museums and private collections, but, because of the classified nature of much Ada programming, these units had been wiped; efforts have been made to boot one of these systems, with little or no luck as of 2013. On 29 October 2019 the DataMuseum.dk successfully got  one unit back into running condition.

External links
Evaluation of the Rational Environment report on analysis of the R1000 by Software Engineering Institute
Press release
Use of the Rational R1000 Ada development environment for an IBM based command and control system. by Charles B. Williams, 1987

References

Integrated development environments
Computer workstations
Ada (programming language)